Steven Davis  (born 1 January 1985) is a Northern Irish professional footballer who plays as a midfielder for Scottish Premiership club Rangers and captains the Northern Ireland national team. Davis made his full international debut in 2005 and has since been capped 140 times, scoring 13 goals, at senior level to become the most capped player in Northern Ireland, and the most capped British player of all time. He captained his nation to the last 16 at UEFA Euro 2016.

Davis began his career with Premier League club Aston Villa in 2004. He was named "Young Player of the Year", "The Fans Player of the Year" and "Player of the Year" for the 2005–06 season after making 42 appearances during the season. Davis was sold to Fulham for £4 million in the summer of 2007, but moved on loan to Scottish club Rangers in January 2008 for an initial six months. He was part of the team that reached the 2008 UEFA Cup Final and that won the 2007–08 Scottish League Cup and 2007–08 Scottish Cup. At the end of the season, he moved permanently to Rangers for £3 million. He made 211 appearances for the Glasgow club, winning three consecutive league titles in 2009, 2010 and 2011, two Scottish Cups and three League Cups.

Following the club's liquidation in 2012, Davis exercised his rights under TUPE regulations to rescind his contract and become a free agent, returning to the Premier League with Southampton. During his later years with Southampton, he captained the side before returning to Rangers under manager Steven Gerrard in 2019.

Club career

Aston Villa

Davis, who was born in Ballymena, County Antrim, started his career at St Andrews Boys Club before transferring to Aston Villa in 2002. He was a member of the 2002 FA Youth Cup winning team that beat Everton 4–2 in the final. His first professional appearance was on 18 September 2004, he was a 57th-minute replacement for Nolberto Solano in a goalless Premier League match against Norwich City at Carrow Road. Davis made 28 league appearances across the season, scoring the winner in a 3–2 comeback victory at Southampton on 16 April 2005.

On 13 August 2005, in Villa's first game of the new campaign, Davis volleyed past Jussi Jääskeläinen to secure a 2–2 home draw against Bolton Wanderers, albeit after nine minutes. He scored twice on 20 September in the third round of the Football League Cup, as Villa won 8–3 at Wycombe Wanderers. By October 2005, he was a regular for the club and missed only one game for Villa in the 2005–06 season. Davis was named Villa's "Young Player of the Year", "The Fans Player of the Year" and "Player of the Year" for the 2005–06 season. His form prompted the Northern Ireland manager Lawrie Sanchez, to state that Davis could be "another Frank Lampard". Davis made 102 appearances for Villa and scored nine times. On 2 January 2006, he headed the first goal of a 2–1 win at rivals West Bromwich Albion.

Fulham
In the summer of 2007, Davis followed teammate Aaron Hughes to Fulham on 5 July 2007 to team up with international manager Sanchez, for a fee of around £4 million. He made his Fulham debut against Arsenal on 12 August 2007 and made 22 appearances for Fulham before moving to Rangers.

Rangers
On 31 January 2008, Davis was signed on a six-month loan by Rangers, the club he supported as a boy. Davis made his Rangers debut against Panathinaikos in the UEFA Cup on 13 February. He scored his first goal, again in European competition, against German team Werder Bremen. Davis scored for Rangers in the penalty shootout against Dundee United that won Rangers the League Cup. He also helped the team reach the 2008 UEFA Cup Final, and won the Scottish Cup in May.

Davis made his move from Fulham permanent on 21 August 2008, in a transfer worth £3 million, signing a four-year contract. He made his first appearance of the season for Rangers against Aberdeen, during a 1–1 draw the day after he permanently signed. Davis scored his first goal for Rangers, since his move became permanent, against Motherwell. He scored the only goal in the final Old Firm derby of the season on 9 May 2009, to take Rangers to the top of the SPL by two points. Davis won the SPL title and Scottish Cup with Rangers in the 2008–09 season.

Davis began his goalscoring in the 2009–10 season against St. Mirren on 27 January. He continued his goalscoring form against Falkirk in the next game, curling a free kick into Bobby Olejnik's top right hand corner. Davis's performances in January 2010, earned him the SPL Player of the Month award. He was also named PFA Scotland Players' Player of the Year on 2 May 2010, and won the SPL and Scottish League Cup each for the second time.

Davis scored his first goal of the 2010–11 season against Motherwell at Ibrox in October 2010, when he collected the ball 30 yards from goal before striking it into the top corner. The goal drew comparisons to former Rangers favourite Ian Durrant. Davis followed this up by scoring the winning goal in the match against Inverness at Ibrox in January 2011. In the 2011 Scottish League Cup Final against Celtic, Davis opened the scoring in a match, which Rangers won 2–1 after extra time. This was the third time he had won the Scottish League Cup. Davis scored in back-to-back games in the 2011 title run in against Motherwell, and then Hearts, before playing his 54th, and final game of the season in a 5–1 win over Kilmarnock, as Rangers won their 3rd consecutive SPL championship.

On 19 July 2011, Davis signed a new five-year contract with Rangers. He was made Rangers temporary captain, with the absence of formal club captain David Weir for the first part of the 2011–12 season. Davis scored his first goal of the 2011–12 season in a 2–0 win over Aberdeen at Ibrox in August. In the first Old Firm match of the 2011–12 season, Davis provided two assists in the game, as Rangers beat Celtic 4–2. After Rangers beat Dunfermline 4–0 at East End Park, Rangers manager Ally McCoist praised Davis's performance by saying "It was a captain's performance from the best player on the park." For his performances during September 2011, he received the SPL Player of the Month award. Following the insolvency of Rangers in 2012, Davis exercised his rights under TUPE regulations to rescind his contract and become a free agent. PFA Scotland had previously commented that players were entitled to become free agents if they objected to the transfer to the new company formed by Charles Green.

Southampton

Davis rejected the chance to stay with Rangers and instead signed a three-year contract with Premier League club Southampton on 6 July 2012. The deal was subsequently extended to 2016 as part of the agreement with Rangers to complete the transfer without the need for the international transfer clearance to be agreed by FIFA, with the two clubs agreeing a fee. After joining Southampton, Davis pleaded the Rangers fans to agree with his decision to leave but accepted that a minority of fans would take a different view and made his explanation he left Rangers in order to revive his football career.

He made his debut on 19 August 2012, and scored to put the team ahead at holders Manchester City only three minutes after coming on as a substitute, but Southampton eventually lost 3–2. His only other goal of the season came against the same opposition, in a 3–1 home win on 13 February 2013.

His first two goals of the 2013–14 season came in a 5–1 victory at Barnsley in the League Cup second round on 27 August, the latter being a penalty.

On 17 October 2014, Davis signed a new contract to keep him at Southampton until 2018.

On 8 May 2016, Davis scored his first ever league brace for Southampton in a 2–1 win over Tottenham Hotspur at White Hart Lane. He followed this up with a goal in a 4–1 victory over Crystal Palace on the final day of the season.

On 18 June 2016, he signed a new three-year contract, extending his stay with the club until 2019.

He made his 200th Southampton appearance on 16 September 2017 against Crystal Palace, scoring the only goal in a 1–0 victory.

Return to Rangers 
On 6 January 2019, Davis returned to Rangers on a six-month loan. On 2 May, Davis agreed to join Rangers permanently once the loan deal had finished, signing a 12-month contract. Davis helped Rangers win the 2020–21 Scottish Premiership, their first Scottish league championship since 2011, and he won the SFWA Footballer of the Year award.

Davis tore his anterior cruciate ligament in December 2022, an injury which required surgery and a long rehabilitation process.

International career
Davis made his full international debut on 9 February 2005 in a 1–0 loss to Canada, and made the assist for David Healy in Northern Ireland's famous 1–0 victory over England in a 2006 World Cup qualification match on 7 September. Davis' first goal came against Wales in a 3–2 home defeat in another qualifier on 8 October. He was also part of the team who beat Spain 3–2 at Windsor Park in September 2006.

On 21 May 2006, he became Northern Ireland's youngest modern day captain against Uruguay in the United States, a 1–0 loss.

On 8 October 2015, Davis scored twice in a 3–1 victory over Greece to help Northern Ireland qualify for the final tournament of Euro 2016, their first European Championship.

In November 2019, he won his 116th cap against the Netherlands and became the most capped British midfielder, passing David Beckham. On 7 September 2020, he equaled Pat Jennings Northern Ireland record of 119 caps,. On 8 October 2020, he played his 120th match for Northern Ireland against Bosnia and Herzegovina in the UEFA Euro 2020 qualifying play-offs, to become the most-capped player in their history. As of February 2023 he has 140 caps, making him the most capped British men's player of all time.

Personal life
Davis was appointed Member of the Order of the British Empire (MBE) in the 2017 Birthday Honours for services to football.

Career statistics

Club

International

As of match played 27 September 2022. Northern Ireland score listed first, score column indicates score after each Davis goal.

Honours
Aston Villa U18
FA Youth Cup: 2001–02

Rangers
Scottish Premier League / Scottish Premiership: 2008–09, 2009–10, 2010–11, 2020–21
Scottish Cup: 2007–08, 2008–09, 2021–22
Scottish League Cup: 2007–08, 2009–10, 2010–11
UEFA Cup / UEFA Europa League runner-up: 2007–08, 2021–22

Southampton
EFL Cup runner-up: 2016–17

Individual
PFA Scotland Players' Player of the Year: 2009–10
PFA Scotland Team of the Year: 2008–09 SPL, 2009–10 SPL, 2011–12 SPL, 2020–21 Scottish Premiership
SFWA Footballer of the Year: 2020–21
Scottish Premier League Player of the Month: January 2010, September 2011
Irish Football Association International Player of the Year: 2015, 2016
NIFWA International Personality of the Year: 2006, 2010, 2014
Aston Villa Supporters' Player of the Year: 2005–06
Aston Villa Players' Player of the Year: 2005–06
Aston Villa Young Player of the Year: 2005–06
Rangers Hall of Fame: 2023

See also
 List of footballers with 100 or more caps

References

External links

Steven Davis Career Profile

Steven Davis profile at the Irish Football Association website

1985 births
Living people
Sportspeople from Ballymena
Association footballers from Northern Ireland
Northern Ireland youth international footballers
Northern Ireland under-21 international footballers
Northern Ireland international footballers
Association football midfielders
Aston Villa F.C. players
Fulham F.C. players
Rangers F.C. players
Southampton F.C. players
Premier League players
Scottish Premier League players
UEFA Euro 2016 players
FIFA Century Club
People educated at Ballymena Academy
Members of the Order of the British Empire
Scottish Professional Football League players